The Hiroshima Children's Museum (広島市こども文化科学館 Hiroshima-shi Kodomo Bunka Kagakukan) is a science museum for children in Hiroshima, Japan.

History

The museum opened in the new building of the Hiroshima City Children's Library in 1980.

Exhibitions
 Exploration hall — for the sense of science — with amusing items and apparatus
 Dreamland of the sky — for the basic science — sparks of the lightning, resonances of the lights and sounds
 Dr.Scitech's happy Laboratory — for the applied science
 Science of the Astronomy
 Theater "Apollo hall" — for the concerts, plays, musicals and other events

Planetarium
 The planetarium is on the 4th floor, with a  diameter dome theater screen and 340 sheets
 The main planetarium projector is Minolta-MS-20AT, and the all-sky monitor and video projectors
 Programs (changed seasonally) 
 Star lights every Sunday
 "Refretarium" (refresh with the planetarium with BGM), every Wednesday 
 Star lights short lives with piano playing or special guests, monthly every last Sunday 
 Concerts
 Star Observations 
 Education programs for school students

Museum shop
 Information and museum shop is on the 1st floor

Programs
 Amateur radio club
 Japan Institute of Invention and Innovation kids club Hiroshima
 Super science museum
 Internship for courage students
 Youth science volunteer to help the events and programs

External links
Hiroshima Children's Museum

Museums established in 1980
1980 establishments in Japan
Museums in Hiroshima
Children's museums in Japan
Science museums in Japan
Planetaria in Japan